Santa Feria (sometimes written SantaFeria) is a musical group from Chile. They play an eclectic style of new Chilean cumbia that they call cumbia casera ("house cumbia"), combining elements of Argentinian cumbia villera ("ghetto cumbia"), ska, reggae, and other Latin music traditions. The group was formed in 2008, and includes ten members, playing guitar, bass, keyboards, brass instruments, and several types of percussion, in addition to vocals.  They have released two albums, Le traigo cumbia ("I bring you cumbia") in 2011, and Lo que va a pasar ("What is going to happen") in 2013.  Several of their songs have become hits in Chile, most notably Sakate Uno.

Members

Alonso "Pollo" González: lead vocals
Nicolas "Schala" Schlein: timbau
Ricardo "Richi" Fuentes: güiro and percussion
Rodrigo "Cogollo" González: bass and chorus
Mauricio Lira: guitar and chorus
Ariel Carrasco: keyboards, charango, and chorus
Francisco Vílchez: trombone
Diego Muñoz: baritone sax
Ignacio Rossello: trumpet
Gonzalo Jara: congas and timbau

Discography

Le traigo cumbia (2011)

Tracks:
El inodoro
Le traigo cumbia
Dulcesito
Con - A - Ce
Amor sin fronteras
Sono el reloj
Negra cumbiambera (video)
Sakate 1 (video)
Asociegate cachorra
Mañosa (video)
Don Satan
Corre que te pillo
Roto y borracho

Lo que va a pasar (2013)

Tracks:
Locura y pasion (con Joe Vasconcellos) (video)
Las cumbieras y los cumbieros
Lo que va a pasar
Hachazo permanente
Quien es
No eh sacado tu (Interludio Violeta)
La espina (video)
Brindemos por la cumbia
Esa guachita (Esa pibita)
Sacate otro
Turbo brass

"astuta" single 2015
http://www.portaldisc.com/santaferia (free download)

External links
 Performance at Festival Buin, February 2015.

References

Chilean cumbia

Rockass Online MUsic USA